Robert H. Clark (March 18, 1863 – August 21, 1919) was a 19th-century Major League Baseball catcher. He played from 1886 to 1893 for the Brooklyn Grays/Bridegrooms, Cincinnati Reds and Louisville Colonels. He appeared in the post-season World Series with Brooklyn twice, in 1889 and 1890.

Clark died in Covington, Kentucky on August 21, 1919 from burns he suffered in a chemical explosion at a Cincinnati factory several months earlier.

References

External links
Baseball-Reference page
Baseball Almanac
Encyclopedia of Baseball Catchers

1863 births
1919 deaths
19th-century baseball players
Brooklyn Bridegrooms players
Brooklyn Grays players
Cincinnati Reds players
Louisville Colonels players
Major League Baseball catchers
Baseball players from Kentucky
Sportspeople from Covington, Kentucky
Accidental deaths in Kentucky
Atlanta Atlantas players
Deaths from fire in the United States
Industrial accident deaths